The Keszthely Synagogue is a synagogue in Keszthely, Hungary.

The synagogue was originally built in 1852 in the neo-classical style. The shape was altered in 1894 when the building was remodeled in the spirit of eclecticism. In 1898 an organ built by Sándor Országh was installed. The temple served the local Neolog congregation.

The building has undergone a number of renovations - in 1930, in 1945 and in 1967. In 1987 part of the ceiling collapsed and as a result planning began in 1991 to fully renovate the building. Full renovation work started in 1993, and the synagogue was reconsecrated on July 7, 1995 in the presence of the President of the Republic Árpád Göncz and the Chief Rabbi Tamás Raj. In 1997 its painted decorations and work on the facade was also completed.

The building
The building was originally accessed via a narrow mew from Fejér György Street where the Jewish School once stood. Today it is accessed through the archway of Pethő House located on Kossuth Lajos Street #22.

The building was erected according to tradition on a lower level as compared to its surroundings. Its East-West length, breadth and height are almost equal. The inside is surrounded on 3 sides by a gallery for women supported by iron columns. The original neo-classical architecture is still preserved on the East side of the synagogue.

History of the Site
A building and the surrounding land on which the synagogue now stands had been owned by the Pethő family who acquired it by royal donation in 1427. In 1739 it was purchased by Christopher Festetics. The Pethő House located on Kossuth Lajos Street #22, and through which the synagogue is currently accessed, is the oldest building in Keszthely and is also notable as being the birthplace of composer Károly Goldmark in 1830. Károly Goldmark's father was the cantor at the synagogue.

History of the Congregation
The first Jews settled in what is now the town of Keszthely in the early 18th century. According to the town census, there were 7 Jewish families by 1745. A functioning Jewish community was established in Keszthely in 1766. A map of 1769 depicts an oblong house of Jews on the main street with a chapel in the yard. The community erected a synagogue on this site designed by architect Christopher Hofstadter. In 1812, the Jewish community purchased the building from the domain and in 1852 built the current building in its place.

Cemetery
The cemetery used by the congregation is located at 33 Goldmark Károly Street.

World War II
During World War II, the Germans used the synagogue as a warehouse and later as a stall, they also destroyed the organ. During the war, 829 members of the Keszthely Jewish congregation were murdered. Today, the names of these individuals are inscribed on 102 marble plates that hang around the inside perimeter of the synagogue. A black obelisk in front of the synagogue acts as a memorial for the ghetto that also occupied the same land. The members of the ghetto were taken first to Zalaegerszeg and then to Auschwitz, the first train arriving there on July 8, 1944.

See also
 History of the Jews in Hungary

Gallery

References

Synagogues in Hungary
Neolog Judaism synagogues
Buildings and structures in Zala County
Neoclassical synagogues
Keszthely
Synagogues completed in 1852
Synagogues completed in 1894